Shubuta Methodist Episcopal Church, South is a historic Methodist Episcopal church on High Street (US 45) on the east side in Shubuta, Mississippi.

It was built in 1891 and added to the National Register in 1994.

References

Methodist churches in Mississippi
Churches on the National Register of Historic Places in Mississippi
Churches completed in 1891
19th-century Methodist church buildings in the United States
National Register of Historic Places in Clarke County, Mississippi
Carpenter Gothic church buildings in Mississippi